Andrew Lewis Charter (born 30 March 1987) is an Australian field hockey player. He played club hockey for Central Hockey Club, winning a championship with the team in 2004 and 2008. He played for the Australian Capital Territory team in the Australian Hockey League. He is a member of the Australia men's national field hockey team.

Personal
Charter is from the Australian Capital Territory. In 2010, he moved from Canberra to Perth in order to train at the Australian Institute of Sport hockey academy.

Field hockey
Charter is a goalkeeper. In 2005, he represented the Australian Capital Territory in the national U21 Championships. In 2006, he was a member of Australian U21 men's hockey team.  He was supposed to make his international debut for the team in a game against Korea but lost the opportunity after he broke a toe while playing football.

Charter used to play club hockey with the Central Hockey Club. He was playing with the club in 2006. His club had a three-week losing streak going into the senior men's ACT grand final. In the final, Charter was in goal and made several important key saves on goal during the game which allowed his side to win the game 3–0. He switched club sides to compete for one in Fremantle in 2010 after moving to the west coast. Charter currently plays hockey with the Westside Side Wolves when he's not on state or national duty. In 2007, 2008, 2010 and 2011, Charter played for the Australian Capital Territory team, the Canberra Lakers. in the Australian Hockey League. In 2007, he was a replacement goalkeeper in a game against New South Wales Arrows after Nathan Burgers injured himself while warming up for the game. He allowed two goals while his team scored two. The game ended in a 4–3 victory for his team after the game went to penalty shots. This was the first time in seven games where his team won when a game went to penalty shots.

National team
Charter is a member of the Australia men's national field hockey team. In 2011, he was a member of the national team that competed at the Azlan Shah Cup in Malaysia. This was the first time he had been called up to play for the national team. In July 2011, he traveled but not compete with the team when they toured Europe. He won a gold medal at the Champion Trophy tournament in 2011. In December 2011, he was named as one of twenty-eight players to be on the 2012 Summer Olympics Australian men's national training squad. This squad will be narrowed in June 2012.  He trained with the team from 18 January to mid-March in Perth. In February during the training camp, he played in a four nations test series with the teams being the Kookaburras, Australia A Squad, the Netherlands and Argentina.

Charter was selected in the Kookaburras Olympics squad for the Tokyo 2020 Olympics. The team reached the final for the first time since 2004 but couldn't achieve gold, beaten by Belgium in a shootout.

References

External links
 
 
 
 

1987 births
Living people
Australian male field hockey players
Male field hockey goalkeepers
2014 Men's Hockey World Cup players
Field hockey players at the 2014 Commonwealth Games
Field hockey players at the 2016 Summer Olympics
Field hockey players at the 2018 Commonwealth Games
Field hockey players at the 2022 Commonwealth Games
2018 Men's Hockey World Cup players
Olympic field hockey players of Australia
Commonwealth Games medallists in field hockey
Commonwealth Games gold medallists for Australia
ACT Academy of Sport alumni
Field hockey players at the 2020 Summer Olympics
Olympic silver medalists for Australia
Medalists at the 2020 Summer Olympics
Olympic medalists in field hockey
20th-century Australian people
21st-century Australian people
Sportsmen from the Australian Capital Territory
2023 Men's FIH Hockey World Cup players
Medallists at the 2014 Commonwealth Games
Medallists at the 2018 Commonwealth Games
Medallists at the 2022 Commonwealth Games